is a railway station on the Shinetsu Main Line in Tagami, Niigata, Japan, operated by East Japan Railway Company (JR East).

Lines
Hanyūda Station is served by the Shinetsu Main Line.

Layout
The station consists of one side platform and one island platform connected to the station building by a footbridge. The station has a "Midori no Madoguchi" staffed ticket office.

Platforms

History

The station opened on 19 April 1903.

Passenger statistics
In fiscal 2015, the station was used by an average of 570 passengers daily (boarding passengers only).

Surrounding area
 Tagami town hall
 National Route 403

See also
 List of railway stations in Japan

References

External links

 JR East station information 

Railway stations in Niigata Prefecture
Railway stations in Japan opened in 1903